Getaria may refer to:

 Getaria, France, in Labourd
 Getaria, Gipuzkoa, Spain